Steven (or Stephen) Wolf (or Wolfe, Woolfe, Wolff) may refer to:

 Stephen Wolf (born 1941), American businessman
 Steven Wolf (active since 1989), American musician and music producer
 Steven Woolfe (born 1967), British politician
 Steven J. Wolfe (born 1959), film producer
 Stephen Wolff, computer scientist
 Johnny Sins (born 1978), American pornographic actor